Földes is a surname of Hungarian origin. People with this surname include:

 Andor Földes (1913 – 1992), Jewish Hungarian pianist
 Dezső Földes (1880 – 1950), Hungarian fencer
 Eniko Földes (born 1944), Hungarian chemist 
 Éva Földes (1914 – 1981), Hungarian author
 Ferenc Földes, namesake of the Ferenc Földes Secondary School, Hungary
 Imre Földes (1881-1948?), Hungarian graphic artist, painter, book designer, poster artist and engraver.
 Imre Földes (writer) (1881-1958), Hungarian playwright and librettist
 Jolán Földes (1902 – 1963), Hungarian author
 László Földes (born 1959), Hungarian architect
 Mária Földes (1925 – 1976), Jewish Romanian-Hungarian playwright
 Sebastian Földes (born 1976), Swedish Lawyer
 Vilmos Földes (born 1984), Hungarian pocket billiards player

Foldes 
 Lawrence D. Foldes, director and producer
 Peter Foldes (1924 – 1977), Hungarian-British director and animator
 Pierre Foldès (born 1951), French surgeon of Hungarian origin
 Yolanda Foldes (1902-1963), Hungarian novelist 

Hungarian-language surnames